The Secretary of Education is a member of the Virginia Governor's Cabinet. The office is currently held by Aimee Guidera.

List of Secretaries of Education
 Earl J. Shiflet (1972–1974)
 Vacant (1974–1976)
 Robert R. Ramsey (1976–1978)
 J. Wade Gilley (1978–1982)
 John T. Casteen III (1982–1985)
 Donald Finley (1985–1990)
 James W. Dyke Jr. (1990–1993)
 Karen J. Petersen (1993–1994)
 Beverly Sgro (1994–1998)

Notes

References

1972 establishments in Virginia
Government agencies established in 1972
Education
Education